The 5th Annual Indonesian Movie Awards was held on May 10, 2011, at the Tennis Indoor Senayan, Central Jakarta. The award show was hosted by Okky Lukman and Choky Sitohang. And the nominations have been announced for the category of Favorite, which will be chosen by the public via SMS. As for the category of Best, will be selected by a jury that has been appointed. As a guest star who will fill the event, among them Afgan, Wali, Petra Sihombing, Nidji, D'Masiv, etc.

7 Hati 7 Cinta 7 Wanita lead nominations with receiving of a total of sixteen nominations, a new record broke the record of eleven nominations for Berbagi Suami in the 2007 of celebration. Three other films competing at the rear, each with receiving of eleven nominations: 3 Hati Dua Dunia, Satu Cinta, Alangkah Lucunya (Negeri Ini), and Minggu Pagi di Victoria Park.

On May 10, 2011, announcement of the winners implemented. The film 7 Hati 7 Cinta 7 Wanita and Minggu Pagi di Victoria Park were biggest winner with receiving of four trophies each, the film 3 Hati Dua Dunia, Satu Cinta and Alangkah Lucunya (Negeri Ini) with receiving two trophies each, while the other film respectively receiving one award each.

Nominees and winners

Best
Winners are listed first and highlighted in boldface.

Favorite
Winners are listed first and highlighted in boldface.

Film with most nominations and awards

Most nominations

The following film received most nominations:

Most wins
The following film received most nominations:

References

External links
 KapanLagi: Nominasi IMA 2011

Indonesian
2011 in Indonesia
Indonesian Movie Actor Awards